Lahae is a suco in Aileu subdistrict, Aileu District, East Timor. The administrative area covers an area of  13.64 square kilometres and at the time of the 2010 census it had a population of  1061 people.

References

Populated places in Aileu District
Sucos of East Timor